Claude Achurch (16 August 1896 – 15 August 1979) was an Australian cricketer, who played for New South Wales in first-class cricket.

See also
 List of New South Wales representative cricketers

References

External links
player profile

1896 births
1979 deaths
Australian cricketers
New South Wales cricketers